Varsity Blues may refer to:

 Varsity Blues (film), a 1999 film starring James Van Der Beek
 Varsity Blues (EP), a 2002 EP by Murs
 Toronto Varsity Blues, the sports teams of the University of Toronto, Canada
 Varsity Blues scandal, a 2019 U.S. college admissions bribery scandal and subsequent federal investigation named after the film

See also 
 Blue (university sport), an award for competition at the highest level